Unbroken and Unplugged is the second EP from Christian rock band Fireflight. It was released independently on September 8, 2009 to holdover fans until the release of their third major full-length studio album For Those Who Wait which was released on February, 9, 2010. It features five newly recorded acoustic arrangements of songs from their first two albums on Flicker Records.

Track listing

References

Fireflight albums
2009 EPs